The Arabian leopard (Panthera pardus nimr) is a leopard subspecies native to the Arabian Peninsula. It has been listed as Critically Endangered on the IUCN Red List since 1996 as fewer than 200 wild individuals were estimated to be alive in 2006. The population is severely fragmented. Subpopulations are isolated and not larger than 50 mature individuals. The population is thought to decline continuously.

The Arabian leopard is the smallest leopard subspecies. It was tentatively affirmed as a distinct subspecies by genetic analysis of a single wild leopard from South Arabia, which appeared most closely related to the African leopard.

Taxonomic history 
Felis pardus nimr was the scientific name proposed by Wilhelm Hemprich and Christian Gottfried Ehrenberg in 1830 for a leopard from Arabia. Panthera pardus jarvisi, proposed by Reginald Innes Pocock in 1932, was based on a leopard skin from the Sinai Peninsula.

In the early 1990s, a phylogeographic analysis was carried out based on tissue samples from Asian and African leopards. P. p. jarvisi was provisionally grouped with the Persian leopard, as tissue samples were not available. Molecular biologists tentatively proposed in 2001 to group the Sinai leopard with P. p. nimr, as again tissue samples were not available.

Characteristics 
The Arabian leopard's fur varies from pale yellow to deep golden, tawny or grey and is patterned with rosettes. The Arabian leopard is smaller than both African and Persian leopards.
It is however the largest cat in the Arabian Peninsula.

Distribution and habitat 

The geographic range of the Arabian leopard is poorly understood but generally considered to be limited to the Arabian Peninsula, including Egypt's Sinai Peninsula. It lives in mountainous uplands and hilly steppes, but seldom moves to open plains, desert or coastal lowlands. It prefers well-vegetated terrain that is difficult for humans to reach. Since the late 1990s, leopards were not recorded in Egypt. One individual was killed in the Elba Protected Area in 2014.

Modeling suggests that the species accumulated genetic and phenotypic differences from its conspecifics at a series of glacial maxima during the last glacial period in a Yemen refugium, from where it expanded elsewhere in the Holocene warming following the expansion of suitable landscape types. As humans expanded as well, they eventually restricted the source populations of the leopard to an area intersecting eastern Yemen and western Oman today.

Until the late 1960s, the Arabian leopard was widely distributed in the mountains along both the coasts of the Red Sea and Arabian Sea. In Saudi Arabia, leopard habitat is estimated to have decreased by around 90% since the beginning of the 19th century. Of 19 reports obtained from informants between 1998 and 2003, only four are confirmed including sightings in one location in the Hijaz Mountains and three locations in the Asir Mountains, with the most recent record in 2002 south of Biljurashi. No leopard was recorded during a camera trapping survey conducted from 2002 to 2003. Although the leopard is officially protected in the country, its remaining range is not encompassed by protected areas.

In the United Arab Emirates, the Arabian leopard was first sighted in 1949 by Wilfred Thesiger in Jebel Hafeet. The exact status of the leopard in the country is unclear. It is either extinct or very rare in the eastern region, with occasional sightings being reported in places like Wadi Wurayah. Before the end of the 20th century, sightings were reported in the areas of Jebel Hafeet and Al Hajar Mountains.

In Oman, leopards were reported to have occurred in the Hajar Mountains until the late 1970s. The largest confirmed sub-population inhabits the Dhofar Mountains in the country's southeast. In the Jabal Samhan Nature Reserve, 17 individual adult leopards were identified between 1997 and 2000 using camera traps. Leopards were also sighted in the Musandam Peninsula, particularly Ras Musandam. The Dhofar mountain range is considered the best habitat for leopards in the country. This rugged terrain provides shelters, shade and trapped water, and harbors a wide variety of prey species, in particular in escarpments and narrow wadis.

In Yemen, leopards formerly ranged in all mountainous areas of the country, including the western and southern highlands eastwards to the border with Oman. Since the early 1990s, leopards are considered rare and close to extinction due to direct persecution by local people and depletion of wild prey.

There was a small population in Israel's Negev desert, estimated at 20 individuals in the late 1970s. Leopards were hunted until the early 1960s. By 2002, fewer than 11 isolated individuals were estimated to survive. Six males, three females and two unsexed individuals were identified in the country, based on genetic analysis of 268 scats collected. About five individuals were thought to survive in the Judaean Desert as of 2005. The last wild leopard in the Negev desert was sighted in Sde Boker in 2007, which was so sick it was taken into a sanctuary and died in 2009. In 2010-11, a leopard was sighted in the northern Arabah Valley.

In Jordan, the last confirmed sighting of a leopard dates to 1987.

Ecology and behaviour 

Arabian leopards are predominantly nocturnal, but are sometimes also seen in daylight. They seem to concentrate on small to medium prey species, and usually store carcasses of large prey in caves or lairs but not in trees. Scat analyses revealed that the main prey species comprise Arabian gazelle, Nubian ibex, Cape hare, rock hyrax, porcupine, Ethiopian hedgehog, small rodents, birds, and insects. Since local people reduced ungulates to small populations, leopards are forced to alter their diet to smaller prey and livestock such as goats, sheep, donkeys and young camels.

In addition to humans, the main competitors of the Arabian leopard are the caracal and the Arabian wolf. It has been suggested that human poaching has reduced the leopard population to an extent that natural competition with other predators is now a threatening factor. Population viability analysis in Saudi Arabia suggests that under stable natural conditions in absence of poaching and restocking, the Arabian leopard would have a survival probability of only 37%; without competition by the caracal, this would increase to 89%; and without the Arabian wolf to 98%. Assuming a moderate poaching rate of six individuals per year would lead to extirpation over the next 100 years.

Information about ecology and behaviour of Arabian leopards in the wild is very limited. A leopard from the Judean desert is reported to have come into heat in March. After a gestation period of 13 weeks, females give birth to two to four cubs in a cave amidst boulders or in a burrow.

Leopard cubs are born with closed eyes that open four to nine days later. Captive-born Arabian leopard cubs emerged from their den for the first time at the age of one month. Cubs are weaned at the age of about three months, and remain with their mother for up to two years.

Threats 

Three confirmed separate subpopulations remain on the Arabian Peninsula with fewer than an estimated 200 leopards. The Arabian leopard is threatened by habitat loss, degradation and fragmentation; prey depletion caused by unregulated hunting; trapping for the illegal wildlife trade and retaliatory killing in defense of livestock.

The leopard population has decreased drastically in Arabia as shepherds and villagers kill leopards in retaliation for attacks on livestock. In addition, hunting of leopard prey species such as hyrax and ibex by local people and habitat fragmentation, especially in the Sarawat Mountains, made the continued survival of the leopard population uncertain. Other reasons for killing leopards are for personal satisfaction and pride, traditional medicine and hides. Some leopards are killed accidentally when eating poisoned carcasses intended for Arabian wolf and striped hyena.
Among the products sold in the tent city of Mina, Saudi Arabia after the Hajj of 2010, skins of Arabian leopards that were poached in Yemen were offered.

The leopard population in Saudi Arabia is affected by the decrease of natural prey species so that leopards increasingly prey on livestock. Local people therefore consider leopards a threat and kill them either by using poison or snares. The leopard population is close to extinction in the country.

The Israeli West Bank Barrier, built by the Israeli government in the mid 2000s disrupts the migration of all terrestrial land animals between Israel and Palestine, therefore reducing animals' natural habitats and causing gene pools to be significantly shallower, which results in inbreeding and infertility.  

In the 1950s, the Arabian leopard population was already decreasing drastically due to habitat degradation and fragmentation, and killing of leopards and prey species.

Conservation 
The Arabian leopard is listed in CITES Appendix I. The current network of protected areas largely under-represents the species suitable habitat only covering its 11%, and most of the survey effort to detect and ensure the survival of the leopard in the peninsula has taken place outside the polygons identified by models as core areas for the species.

The  Jabal Samhan Nature Reserve was established in 1997 after camera trap records of leopards were obtained; camera trapping since then has identified 17 individual adult leopards, including one cub. Al Jazeera spotlighted successful tracking efforts in the Nature Reserve in a 2012 episode of its program Witness.

At least ten wild leopards were live-captured in Yemen since the early 1990s and sold to zoos; some have been placed in conservation breeding centers in the UAE and Saudi Arabia.

A detailed study of leopard distribution and habitat requirement is needed for the management of the species. The ecological information needed include data on feeding behavior, range use and reproduction. This information is of great importance to the survival of the species. There are many sites already surveyed and considered to be suitable for preservation for leopards in the plan adopted by the national commission for wildlife conservation and development. These areas include Jebel Fayfa, Jebel Al-Qahar, Jebel Shada, which has already been gazetted as a protected area, Jebel Nees, Jebel Wergan, Jebel Radwa and Harrat Uwayrid. The formal establishment of some of these areas is now urgent.

A successful conservation strategy must promote the awareness of the importance of leopard conservation, employing the media and perhaps other sources for basic education programs. The support and involvement of people living close to leopard habitats are vital in such efforts. This is true not only because they might affect the conservation of the leopard in one way or another, but also because they depend on their livestock which could be killed occasionally by leopards. Although it is not always practical, compensation for lost livestock from leopard predation should be considered.

Revenue from sources such as hunting rights and ecotourism, services such as roads and school employment in protected areas would encourage local residents to participate in leopard conservation. Furthermore, well-managed protected areas will ensure the continued survival of the species until other factors enhancing its survival become effective. Public awareness, fruitful consideration of the needs of local people and ecological studies may take years to be useful.

In Yemen, Dutch efforts are underway to conserve leopards at two sites, including Hawf Protected Area. In Saudi Arabia, authorities have undertaken efforts to create Sharaan Nature Reserve, a wildlife sanctuary for the leopard in the area of Al-`Ula.

In captivity 
The first Arabian leopards were captured in southern Oman and registered in the studbook in 1985. Captive breeding was initiated in 1995 at the Oman Mammal Breeding Centre and is operated at a regional level on the Arabian Peninsula. Since 1999, the regional studbook is coordinated and managed by personnel of the Breeding Centre for Endangered Arabian Wildlife in Sharjah. , nine institutions participated in the breeding programme and kept 42 males, 32 females, and three unsexed leopards, of which 19 were wild caught. This captive population comprised 14 founders that have an unequal number of descendants.

In Yemen, leopards were kept at Ta'izz and Sana'a Zoos.

Two cubs were born on 26 April 2019 at the Prince Saud Al-Faisal Wildlife Research Center in Ta'if.

See also 
Leopard subspecies: African leopard  Amur leopard  Anatolian leopard  Indian leopard  Indochinese leopard  Javan leopard  Persian leopard  Sri Lankan leopard

 Chinese leopard
 Zanzibar leopard
 Panthera pardus spelaea

References 

Critically endangered fauna of Asia
Fauna of Egypt
Leopards
Mammals of the Arabian Peninsula
Mammals of the Middle East
Leopard, Arabian
Vertebrates of Israel
Taxa named by Christian Gottfried Ehrenberg
Taxa named by Wilhelm Hemprich